Christian John Skovgaard (born 1 August 1989) is a Danish male badminton player.

Achievements

European Junior Championships
Boys' doubles

BWF International Challenge/Series
Men's doubles

Mixed doubles

 BWF International Challenge tournament
 BWF International Series tournament
 BWF Future Series tournament

References

External links
 

1989 births
Living people
Danish male badminton players